Jorge Cabrera (born 13 January 1974) is an Uruguayan former basketball player.

References

1974 births
Living people
Basketball players at the 1999 Pan American Games
Pan American Games competitors for Uruguay
Uruguayan men's basketball players
Place of birth missing (living people)
20th-century Uruguayan people